Count Redmond O'Hanlon, (c. 1640 – 25 April 1681) was a 17th-century Irish tóraidhe or rapparee; an outlawed member of the Gaelic nobility of Ireland who still held to the code of conduct of the traditional chiefs of the Irish clans.

Historian John J. Marshall has called Redmond O'Hanlon Ireland's answer to Robin Hood and Rob Roy MacGregor. Stephen Dunford has further dubbed O'Hanlon, "The Irish Skanderbeg."

Family background 

Although born in impoverished circumstances, Redmond was part of the Derbfine of the last O'Hanlon Chief of the Name, Lord of Airgíalla, and Master of Tandragee Castle.

During the Nine Years' War, Sir Oghie O'Hanlon had allied the Clan with Queen Elizabeth I of England against Hugh O'Neill and Red Hugh O'Donnell. In 1606, Sir Oghie received his Clan's lands under the policy of Surrender and regrant. According to Royal decree, the family's manor was to be passed on to Sir Oghie's heirs under Primogeniture, rather than the Brehon Law policy of Tanistry.

Sir Oghie's grant was revoked, however, when his son and many other relations joined Sir Cahir O'Doherty's Rebellion in 1608. As a result, the O'Hanlon family was reduced to ruling a small portion of the clan's former homeland. The rest became the property of Sir Oliver St. John, the Lord Deputy of Ireland, who evicted the O'Hanlons from 
the best land on his estate, which was planted with Scottish and English Protestants. During the Irish Rebellion of 1641, the O'Hanlon clan rose and attempted to retake their traditional lands in vain. 

Sir Oghie's heirs lost what little land they still possessed following the Cromwellian conquest of Ireland. In accordance with the Act for the Settlement of Ireland 1652, the O'Hanlon family's remaining lands were confiscated and they were deported to Connaught.

Early life
According to John J. Marshall, Of the childhood and upbringing of the famous outlaw we have no reliable account, but a very rare pamphlet on the life and death of Redmond O'Hanlon, dated 1st August 1681 and published in Dublin, 1682, states that "Redmond, son of Loghlin O'Hanlon, was born near Poyntzpass in the County of Armagh in the year 1640," but some of the later lives say he was born at the foot of Slieve Gullion, and local tradition confirms this. "It was his good fortune to be educated in an English school where he attained to such perfection in that language that it might have proved a great advantage to him in the afterlife." His linguistic accomplishments certainly did prove useful to him in the afterlife. He is represented as a most accomplished gentleman, equal to Ossory, who was accounted for manners and bearing the finest cavalier since Sir Philip Sidney. He was also an excellent actor and mimic, able to personate a King's officer, merchant or countryman, as the exigencies of the case required. In one of the contemporary pamphlets, there is given what is most evidently a fictitious account of his youth and early days in which he is represented as a being a footman for Sir George Acheson of Markethill, and while in the gentleman's employment practising himself in all the accounts of roguery. Cosgrave's account seems quite probable when he says – "Redmond once happened to be at the killing of a gentleman in a quarrel, and flying for safety, stayed abroad for a long time, still refusing to come to a trial, till he was outlawed, which put him into his shifts." It is likely that O'Hanlon fled to France and there joined the Army where he acquired which he so often turned to good use in his after-career, and also was able to speak French like a native, Gaelic and English being equally at his command.

It is not known when he returned to Ireland, but Stephen Dunford suggests it was around 1660, as part of the Restoration of King Charles II to the Irish throne. Like all the other Ulster landowners who had been dispossessed for supporting King Charles I during the Cromwellian invasion of Ireland, Clan O'Hanlon soon realized that there would be no restoration of their property by the new King. In response, Redmond took to the hills around Slieve Gullion and became an outlaw, or rapparee.

According to Stephen Dunford, "He is likely to have seen himself as one of the chieftains of the clan and therefore honour-bound to exact justice."

Outlaw
Although Redmond O'Hanlon has often been compared to a real-life Robin Hood, he has much more in common with Rob Roy MacGregor.

Like many Irish and Scottish clan chiefs of the same era, O'Hanlon operated an extralegal Watch over the Anglo-Irish landlords and Ulster Scots merchants of Armagh, Tyrone, and Down. In return for an annual fee, O'Hanlon retrieved cattle and horses stolen from landlords under his Watch and paid in full for what could not be restored. Peddlers and merchants who placed themselves under the Count's Watch were provided with a written pass, which was to be shown to highwaymen wishing to rob them. The protection money O'Hanlon received, which Protestant landlords and settlers in Ireland referred to as "black rent", was used to pay O'Hanlon's many spies and to feed his clansmen and their families.

Anyone who robbed travellers who carried the Count's passes or rustled livestock from herds under his Watch were forced to return the stolen money or merchandise and we're fined for the first two offences. Anyone who did so a third time was killed. O'Hanlon is described as scrupulously adhering to his word once it was given.

In 1674 the authorities in Dublin Castle put a price on Redmond O'Hanlon and several other known outlaws. In 1676, the price was increased, with posters advertising for his capture, dead or alive.

A 1681 pamphlet describes his character: "Necessity first prompted him to evil courses and success hardened him in them; he did not rob to maintain his own prodigality, but to gratify his spies and pensioners: Temperance, Liberality, and Reservedness were the three qualities that preserved  him; none but they of the House where he was knew till the next morning where he lay all night; he allowed his followers to stuff themselves with meat and good liquor, but confined himself to milk and water; he thought it better thrift to disperse his money among his Receivers and Intelligencers, than to carry it in a purse, or hide it in a hole; he prolonged his life by a general distrust."

Tory Hunters
According to Stephen Dunford, "Tory hunting was then a popular pastime and many adventurers eagerly joined in the chase... It was a lucrative business and in June 1676 alone seven known outlaws had been killed. Two of the most notorious Tory-hunting families in the country were the Cootes of Cootehill and the Johnstons of the Fews, planters infamous for their cruelty and ruthlessness in tracking down and murdering priests. Tradition has it that on one occasion the Johnstons tracked Redmond as far as the shore of Carlingford Lough. With the pursuers at his heels, the outlaw was left with no option but to swim the estuary. He was spotted entering the water by the hunters, they unleashed a ferocious hound and the massive animal plunged into the water in pursuit. The dog caught up with Redmond and a fierce struggle ensued, man against beast, with the outlaw proving victorious: he drowned the dog and escaped."

Also according to Dunford, "He was nothing if not resourceful. Legend has it that when the need arose Redmond was known to reverse his horse's shoes to confuse his pursuers. There are accounts of him and his gang using reversible jackets ... When turned inside out they became the red coats of the army, and were used on many occasions to outwit the authorities and unsuspecting travellers."

The informer-priest

Roman Catholic priest Fr. Edmund Murphy was stationed in Killeavy, County Armagh, a parish located in the heart of O'Hanlon country. On the instructions of Archbishop Oliver Plunkett, Father Murphy began denouncing the Count and his co-conspirators from the pulpit. 

In a pamphlet printed in London as propaganda for the Titus Oates Plot, Father Murphy alleged that the Count responded by threatening Father Murphy with dire consequences if he did not desist. When Father Murphy ignored the warning, O'Hanlon decreed that any parishioner who attended a Mass offered by the Rector of Killeavy would be fined one cow for the first offence, two for the second offence, and for the third offence would be killed. After this threat was carried out against two Killeavy parishioners, Father Murphy arranged for another priest to take his place and began to spend an increasing amount of time plotting vengeance against Redmond O'Hanlon.

In this Father Murphy was assisted by Cormacke Raver O'Murphy, a former O'Hanlon associate who had begun brazenly robbing travellers who carried the Count's passes. Together, Father Murphy and Cormacke Raver began plotting a means to lure the Count to a location where he could be captured or assassinated. To Father Murphy's outrage, however, Ensign John Smith and Lieutenant Henry Baker, who commanded the local British Army garrison, were profiting considerably from their alliance with O'Hanlon and had no desire to curb the Count's activities.

Ultimately, Cormacke O'Murphy was assassinated by a disgruntled associate who had secretly allied himself with O'Hanlon. Father Murphy, however, was unwilling to give up.

Henry St. John 
Anglo-Irish landowner Henry St John of Tandragee had inherited the traditional lands of the O'Hanlon clan from his great-uncle, Sir Oliver St John and from his father Sir John St John.

According to the Reverend Lawrence Power, an Anglican minister whose parish at Tandragee stood on Henry St. John's estate and enjoyed his patronage, "Mr. Henry St. John scorned to have any correspondence with such rascals, no not to redeem a stolen horse or cow, he defied and prosecuted them to the uttermost..."

Henry St. John also earned Redmond's undying hatred by continuing his uncle's policy of evicting the Count's clansmen en masse and replacing them with Scotch-Irish Protestants. In response, Redmond O'Hanlon retaliated by ordering the mass theft of Henry St John's livestock and the armed robbery of his factors and rent collectors.

Seething with hatred, Henry St. John began waging a private war against the O'Hanlon Gang. The death of his nineteen-year-old son from a chill gained while pursuing the Count only made Henry St. John increasingly brutal toward anyone suspected of aiding Redmond O'Hanlon.

In his letters to The Vatican, Archbishop Oliver Plunkett alleged that tory-hunters like Henry St John spent more time sacking, pillaging, and burning out law-abiding Catholics than actively searching for rapparees and tories. This may have been done, however, to provoke hunted outlaws into coming out of hiding to fight. As a result of the ensuing persecution, large numbers of Catholic refugees began fleeing to County Donegal.

On 9 September 1679, St John was riding on his estate with a manservant and the Reverend Power, Vicar of Tandragee. A party of Tories rode into view and seized him. Although Stephen Dunford believes that the intention was simply to hold St. John for ransom, Reverend Power was warned that the landlord would be killed if a rescue was attempted. Moments later, a group of the St. John family's Protestant tenants rode into view and opened fire on the kidnappers. As a result, Henry St. John received a pistol ball in the forehead. According to Reverend Power, the fatal shot was fired, point-blank, by the Tory who was leading away Henry St. John's horse.

Rumours among Armagh's Anglo-Irish gentry alleged that the landlord had been slain by friendly fire from his own tenants. It was further said that St. John had dealt dishonourably with local Tories and therefore deserved what he got.

At the landlord's funeral, an outraged Reverend Power denied both claims. He also denounced both the rapparees and the many local Protestant landlords who did business with them. His sermon read in part, "I can boldly say in front of you all, that I have heard many of you accuse one another of harbouring this infamous rebels and that they help to furnish your kitchens and tables." Rev. Power climaxed by demanding that local Protestants prove their racial superiority to the native Irish by rising up and destroying the rapparees and Tories.

The full text of Reverend Power's sermon was printed by in London as propaganda for the Titus Oates Plot. It was given the name, "The Righteous Man's Portion." Reverend Power also began sending letters to the Lord Deputy of Ireland, James Butler, 1st Duke of Ormonde, and pleaded with him to destroy Redmond O'Hanlon. He further named several prominent aristocrats and Crown officials who had regular dealings with local outlaws.

In one such letter, Rev. Power wrote, "Their chief Redmond O'Hanlon is described as a cunning, dangerous fellow, who, though proclaimed an outlaw along with the rest of his crew and sums of money on their heads, yet he reigns and keeps in subjection so far that is credibly reported, he raises more in a year by contribution than the King's Land, Taxes, and Chimney-Money come to; and thereby is enabled to bribe Clerks and Officers, if not their masters, and makes all to much truckle for him."

According to Ulster's oral tradition, Redmond O'Hanlon travelled to visit his family in Letterkenny, County Donegal, where they were prospering as merchants under the protection of the Chief of Clan O'Doherty and Sir John Conyngham, whose brother David had married Isabel O'Hanlon, the Count's sister. Redmond O'Hanlon remained as in Donegal as a guest at Letterkenny Castle until the heat died down over Henry St John's assassination. According to legend, he also had a dalliance with Sir John's daughter. At the conclusion of his visit, O'Hanlon was escorted back to Armagh, under the protection of an armed guard of Sir John Conyngham's men.

The Titus Oates Plot

In 1678, former Catholic seminarian Titus Oates had gone public with allegations of a non-existent Catholic conspiracy aimed at assassinating King Charles II of England and massacring the Protestants of the British Isles. As a result, more than 22 Catholic clergy and laity were falsely convicted of high treason and executed at Tyburn. The last to be hanged, drawn, and quartered, was Archbishop Oliver Plunkett of Armagh.

In 1680, Father Edmund Murphy agreed to testify falsely at the high treason trial of Archbishop Plunkett. When this became known in Armagh, Ensign Smith and Lt. Baker set out to assassinate the priest. Whether they did so at O'Hanlon's orders remains unknown. However, Father Murphy was placed in Dublin Castle for his own protection. In retaliation, Lt. Baker and Ensign Smith murdered one of Father Murphy's informants and delivered his head to the Lord Deputy as that of a hunted outlaw. To Father Murphy's outrage, they were paid a substantial bounty.

According to John J. Marshall, Redmond O'Hanlon was offered a full pardon by Rev. Henry Jones, the Church of Ireland's Welsh-born Bishop of Meath. Bishop Jones, who Marshall describes as, "an ultra-Protestant," was interested in using the outlaw Count as a witness against Archbishop Plunkett and other alleged Catholic traitors.

According to Stephen Dunford, "O'Hanlon refused. He protested that no offer could induce him to betray an innocent man, even though the man in question had on numerous occasions denounced outlaws: during the General Synod of the Irish Church in 1670, the Archbishop had ordered priests and preachers to warn all their people against, 'giving aid to Tories.'"

As persecution of Catholics heated up in reaction to the Titus Oates plot, a priest named Father Mac Aidghalle was murdered while saying Mass at a Mass rock that still stands atop Slieve Gullion. The perpetrators were a band of redcoats under the command of a priest hunter named Turner. Redmond O'Hanlon is said in local tradition to have avenged the murdered priest and in so doing to have sealed his own fate.

The Viceroy's murder plot

In the spring of 1680, the Duke of Ormonde ordered one of his Dublin spies to find, "an army man in the Armagh area with the credentials to carry out a dangerous undercover task." At the advice of his agent, the Viceroy selected William Lucas, an Anglo-Irish landlord from Dromantine, County Down. The Lucas family had a long and profitable history with the O'Hanlon gang. Furthermore, Lucas' uncle, Sir Toby Poyntz of Poyntzpass, a justice of the peace, had been named by Rev. Power one of the outlaw Count's closest associates in the Ulster gentry.

Despite this, the Duke gave Lucas a written statement:
"Whereas William Lucas Gent. hath given me good reason to believe that he is able to do His Majesty good service in the Apprehending, Killing, and Destroying of proclaimed Rebels and Tories; if he may, upon occasion, have the help and assistance of His Majesty's Army, as he shall desire. These are therefore to Will and Require all His Majesty's  Officers, Civil and Military, to be aiding and assisting to the said William Lucas in the said service. And I particularly require all Officers of Horse and Foot, to send as many of the Soldiers, under their respective Commands, as he shall desire with him; and to direct such Soldiers to obey his Orders. And I further Authorize the said William Lucas in my Name to give assurance to any of the Tories, that in case they shall assist him in the performance of the said service, that they shall have His Majesty's Gracious Pardon for any Crimes formerly committed by them, Murder only accepted. And that over and above, they shall be well rewarded. Given at His Majesty's Castle of Dublin this 4th of March, 1680. Ormond.

In December 1680, Sir Toby Poyntz and his son Charles arranged for Lucas to speak with Art McCall O'Hanlon, the Count's foster brother and trusted bodyguard. Using the Viceroy's authorisation, Lucas offered Art a full pardon and half of the bounty in exchange for the murder of Count Redmond O'Hanlon. Art O'Hanlon accepted the offer and began searching for an opportune moment. In response, Lucas gave Art a written pardon which explained that the Count's foster brother was under his protection.

Assassination
On 25 April 1681, Count Redmond O'Hanlon was fatally shot by Art MacCall O'Hanlon near Hilltown, County Down. According to the most popular account, the murder took place while the Count was sleeping.

A 1681 pamphlet, however, gives a very different account which it claims comes directly from Art O'Hanlon. According to the pamphlet, "...the said Art O Hanlan and William O Sheel, in company with Redmond O Hanlan, were near the Eight Mile Bridge in the County of Down, on the score of a Fair that was held there, at which place, while they were watching for their Prey, Redmond took some occasion to quarrel with Art, as they were smoking their pipes, and in the close bid him provide for himself, for he should not be any longer a Tory in any of the three Counties (viz. Monaghan, Down, or Armagh) whereupon Art rose up and said, 'I am very glad of it, and will go just now'; and then taking up his Arms (having his authority and protection on about him) immediately he shot Redmond in the left breast with his carbine, and forthwith ran to the Eight Mile Bridge for a Guard, but Art returned with a Guard, and Mr. Lucas, who soon had notice in Newry where he was waiting for Redmond's motions, for the same Ensign found Redmond's body, but the head was taken off by O Sheel, who fled with it, the body they removed to Newry, where it lies under a Guard till Orders be sent how it should be disposed of; and since that Mr. Lucas has sent out a Protection and Assurance to O Sheel, to bring in the Head of that Arch-Traitor and Tory Redmond O Hanlan."

After William O'Sheel surrendered it to William Lucas, Redmond O'Hanlon's head was displayed on a spike upon Downpatrick jail. The Count's body was buried in the Roman Catholic cemetery at Ballynabeck, on the road between Tandragee to Scarva.

Art McCall O'Hanlon received a full pardon and one hundred pounds from the Lord Deputy for murdering his foster brother. William Lucas received a Lieutenant's commission. However, Lieutenant William Lucas continued to hunt down and summarily execute large numbers of real and imagined outlaws and collected bounties for their heads. Art O'Hanlon and William O'Sheel acted as his "spotters." This led, according to Marshall, to, "a veritable reign of terror," in the three counties, "especially among the native Irish."

On 29 May 1681, Captain Thomas Whitney, an officer stationed in Tandragee, wrote the following words to the Duke of Ormonde, "...the natives, who never durst trust themselves with their houses nor homes since the death of the boy of fifteen or sixteen years, who was killed lately near Newry, and his head sent for a Tory's head to Armagh. My Lord, I endeavoured by all the means I could to take off their fear, and told them that Your Grace upon notice of the wrongs done them by those that pretend authorities of Your Grace for doing service, require a relation of your inquiries from Sir George Rawdon, Sir Hans Hamilton, and others. My Lord, this day I saw a boy of thirteen years old come to Sir Hans Hamilton, and begged upon his hands and knees that his life be secured for that he was returned a Tory and Art O'Hanlon was in search for him to cut off his head. My Lord, several poor people whose cattle and goods the Mullens of Tandragee took, and others who were like to starve, I had restored. My Lord, very sad and great wrongs there is done and in these parts, and will be more unless speedily enquired into."

Family

According to legend, the Count's mother travelled to Downpatrick Gaol and composed an Irish language keen upon seeing her son's head on a spike. Stephen Dunford gives the following translation:

 "Dear head of my darling,
 How gory and pale;
 These aged eyes see thee, 
 High spiked on their jail.
 That cheek in the summer,
 No more will grow warm; 
 Nor that eye e'er catch light, 
 But the flash of the storm."

According to tradition, the O'Hanlon and Conyngham families travelled to Ballynabeck, exhumed the Count's remains, and buried them in a family plot in Conwal Parish Church cemetery in Letterkenny, County Donegal. The site, near the Vestry door, is marked by a flat gravestone inscribed with the O'Hanlon coat of arms.

The inscription reads:
"The five sons of Redmond Hanlen, Mercht. in Letterkenny: John, the firstborn, Alexander, Francis, John and Redmond. Also here lieth the body of William, the son of the aforesaid Redmond Hanlen who departed this life the 27th ...1708, aged ...3 years ...months and 14 days. Also the remains of David Conyngham, Gent., and Cath., his wife, daughter to Redmond Hanlen. They were esteemed more for goodness of heart than for affluence of fortune. Died lamented here on ...December 1752, 72 years old. She 21st August, 1775, aged 80."

In popular culture
Redmond O'Hanlon's popularity was immortalised in the pulp fiction of the era in addition to folktales which survive to the present day. The legends focus upon his ability to humiliate the Anglo-Irish gentry and the redcoats.

According to D. J. O'Donoghue's account of his 1825 Irish tour, Sir Walter Scott was fascinated by the life and career of Redmond O'Hanlon. Hoping to make him the protagonist of an adventure novel, Scott corresponded with Lady Olivia Sparrow, an Anglo-Irish landowner from County Down. Although Scott asked Lady Sparrow to obtain as much information as possible about O'Hanlon, he was forced to give up on the project after finding documentation too scanty.

In 1862, William Carleton published Redmond Count O'Hanlon; The Irish Rapparee, an adventure novel inspired by the outlaw Count's life. One of Carleton's biographers alleges that the novelist glorified a 17th-century rapparee because he did not feel able to praise the Ribbonmen of his own era. According to O'Donoghue, however, Carleton's novel does not depict the historical Redmond O'Hanlon, but rather a figure of his own imagination.

More recently, Count Redmond O'Hanlon's name is mentioned in The Ballad of Douglas Bridge by Francis Carlin. His career is also celebrated in folk songs composed by P.J. McCall and Tommy Makem.

In Poyntzpass, County Armagh, the local Gaelic football team is named "The Redmond O'Hanlons" in his honour. Furthermore, O'Hanlon's life was the subject of an episode of the television documentary series "Rapairí", which aired on TG4 in November 2009.

In 2019, Michael Kerrigan published An Universal Wolf: The Life & Times of Redmond O'Hanlon. It is an historical novel that is based on real people and actual events. Part fact, part legend, the tale is composed of history, myth, and conjecture. Persons and events described within it relate to an obscure but significant period in Irish history: significant because the struggle between the natives and the settlers that began with the Plantation of Ulster continues still, 400 years later. Traced back to the original Norman Invasion of Ireland in 1169, however, establishes The Troubles as the longest-lived conflict in the history of the world.

References

Further reading
 Canning, Joseph, The O'Hanlons of Orior 1558–1691:Part II, Seanchas Ard Mhacha, pp. 111–129, 2002 
 Count Hanlan's Downfall; or A True and Exact Account of the Killing of that Arch Traitor and Tory Redmond O Hanlan, Printed by Joseph Ray at College Green, for William Winter, Bookseller at the Wandring Jew in Castlestreet, 1681.
 Dunford, Stephen. The Irish Highwaymen. Dublin: Merlin Publishing, 2001. 
 Marshall, John J. Irish Tories, Rapparees and Robbers; With Some Account of the Most Notable, Tyrone Printing Company, Dungannon, 1927.
 Power, Rev. Laurence, The Righteous Man's Portion: Delivered in a Sermon at the Obsequies of the Noble and Renowned Gentleman Henry St. John, Esquire, London, Printed by J.M. for Henry Bonwicke at the Red-Lyon in St. Paul's Church-Yard, 1680.
 R. A. The Life and Death of the Indefatigible Outlaw Redmond O'Hanlon, Printed at Dublin, 1682.

External links 
  (Google Books)
 "Redmond O'Hanlon – Outlaw or Folk Hero?" An Article Written for the South Armagh Genealogical Project
 "Bandit Country," A 2003 Magazine Article About the Outlaw Count
 "O'Hanlon Folklore," Containing Several Ballads About Count Redmond O'Hanlon
 

1620 births
1681 deaths
17th-century Irish people
Assassinated Irish people
Deaths by firearm in Ireland
Extortionists
Irish crime bosses
Irish folklore
Irish murder victims
Irish outlaws
Irish soldiers in the French Army
Irish soldiers in the Irish Confederate Wars
People associated with the Popish Plot
People from County Armagh
People murdered in Ireland